Richard Hartley Smith Abbott (1859 – 28 February 1940) was an Australian politician.

Born in Bendigo, Victoria, he was educated at Bendigo High School and then at the University of St Andrews in Scotland. He became a businessman, especially in tanning, building societies and gas companies. He served on Strathfieldsaye Council, and in 1907 was elected to the Victorian Legislative Assembly, serving until 1913. Having served as Mayor of Bendigo City Council in 1917, he returned to the Council 1922-1928 for the Country Party.

On 18 October 1928, he was appointed to the Australian Senate to fill the remainder of federal Country Party Senator David Andrew's term (Andrew had chosen not to contest the 1928 election, but had died before his term expired). Thus Abbott served until the expiry of Andrew's term on 30 June 1929. He became a businessman, and died in 1940.

References

External links
 

National Party of Australia members of the Parliament of Australia
Members of the Australian Senate for Victoria
Members of the Australian Senate
National Party of Australia members of the Parliament of Victoria
Alumni of the University of St Andrews
1859 births
1940 deaths
20th-century Australian politicians